is a professional tennis player from Japan.

Career
Inoue reached the semifinals of the 2009 Wimbledon girls' singles.

On 28 September 2015, she achieved her career-high WTA singles ranking of No. 275.

Inoue made her main-draw debut on the WTA Tour in doubles competition at the 2015 Toray Pan Pacific Open, partnering Kyōka Okamura.

ITF Circuit finals

Singles: 12 (5 titles, 7 runner-ups)

Doubles: 20 (9 titles, 11 runner-ups)

References

External links
 
 

1991 births
Living people
Japanese female tennis players
Sportspeople from Nagoya
People from Kasugai, Aichi
20th-century Japanese women
21st-century Japanese women